Francis Alphonso Collins (September 28, 1901 – November 9, 1940) was a Canadian ice hockey player.

Collins won a silver medal with the Canada men's national ice hockey team, coached by Harold Ballard, at the 1933 World Ice Hockey Championships  held in Prague, Czechoslovakia.

References

External links

1901 births
1940 deaths
Canadian ice hockey right wingers
Ice hockey people from Ontario